The Mali River (Mali Hka) is a river that originates in the hills of Kachin State, in the northern border of Myanmar. It flows approximately 320 km, when it meets with the N'Mai River and forms the Ayeyarwady River.

History
Construction of the Myitsone Dam has begun at the confluence of the Mali and the N'Mai River.

See also
List of rivers in Burma

References

Rivers of Myanmar